The Lijiang–Shangri-La railway or Lixiang railway, is an electrified railway under construction in Yunnan Province of Southwest China, due to be completed in 2021. The shorthand name of the line is named after its two proposed terminal cities, Lijiang and Shangri-La.

The line is slated to run  from Lijiang railway station of the Dali–Lijiang railway, north to Shangri-La in northwestern Yunnan. Despite approval of the project's feasibility plans by the National Development and Reform Commission in May 2009, construction did not begin until July 22, 2014. At the time, construction was expected to take six years. It was subsequently expected to open by the end of 2021, but  was still under construction, with delays caused by flooding and landslips in the complex geological conditions.

Rail connections
 Lijiang railway station: Dali–Lijiang railway

See also
 List of railways in China

References

Railway lines in China
Rail transport in Yunnan